Acontias fitzsimonsi, Fitzsimons' legless skink or Fitzsimon's legless skink, is a species of lizard in the family Scincidae. It is endemic to South Africa.

References

Acontias
Skinks of Africa
Endemic reptiles of South Africa
Reptiles described in 1968
Taxa named by Donald George Broadley